St. Joseph's College Ombaci is a boys-only boarding middle and high school located in Arua District in the Northern Region of Uganda.

Location
The college is located in Ombaci, Ombaci Ward, Ayivu Division, Arua City, in the West Nile sub-region, in northwestern Uganda. The geographical coordinates of the college are:
3°03'44.0"N, 30°56'11.0"E (Latitude:3.062222; Longitude:30.936389).

History
The college was founded in 1943 by the Comboni Missionaries, as a technical school, to skill returnees from World War II in technical vocations such as automotive mechanics, brick laying, masonry, carpentry and the like. In 1960, Ombaci College was converted into a secondary school. During the 1970s and 1980s, Ombaci rose to become one of the top five secondary schools in Uganda, under the leadership of its first headmaster, Father Marco Lino Mich, then later under Hercules Abiriga.

The Ugandan civil wars, from 1979 until 1981 and from 1981 until 1986 adversely affected academic standards at Ombaci. Despite the challenges, the headmasters Augustine Juruga, Andresile and John Adrionzi posted impressive academic results. The period of the early 2010s saw a drop in performance. Credit is given to Andrew Tumwesige, who was headmaster from 2012 until 2018, for turning the school around.  The current headmaster  Charles Ondoga has continued on the positive trajectory of progress. Under him the schools academic standards have already reached the past peaks of 1980s when the school competed nationally.

List of Headmasters:

 Fr. Pietro Simoncelli (1943-1957) Born 17/6/1891 Died 26/7/1964
 Fr. Luiji Ponzoni (1957-1966) Born 28/7/1913 Died 7/9/1987
 Fr. Lino Mich Marco (1966-1983)
 Mr. Hercules Abiriga (1983-1994)
 Mr. Adrian Andresile (1994-1996; 1997-1998)
 Mr. Andrionzi John (1996-1997)
 Mr. Juruga Augustine (1998-2010)
 Mr. Akuma Santos (2010-2012)
 Mr. Tumwesige Andrew (2012-2018)
 Mr. Ondoga Charles (2018- todate)

Prominent alumni
 Dr. Worodria William consultant Physician Mulago nation referral hospital
 Hon. Feta Geofrey, Member of Parliament for Ayivu West, Arua City in the 11th Parliament (2021 - 2026)
Dr. Bhoka Didi George, Member of Parliament Obongi in the 11th Parliament
Hon. Leku Joel, Member of parliament Terego West in the 11th Parliament
 Richard Idro, consultant pediatric neurologist and President of Uganda Medical Association
 Raphael p'Mony Wokorach, the bishop of the Roman Catholic Diocese of Nebbi
Fr. Rufino Ezama MCCJ, Provincial Superior of the Comboni Missionaries, North America

Ombaci Massacre

On Wednesday, 24 June 1981, six months into the second reign of Apollo Milton Obote, UNLA soldiers arrived at the Ombaci Catholic Mission and adjoining secondary school. They began to indiscriminately kill civilians, women, children and the  elderly; by shooting, bludgeoning, stabbing, lancing, stomping, kicking and exploding ordinance (rocket propelled grenades). 

The exact number of people killed is not accurately known. Credible sources have quoted a number as "over 80". Another credible source reports that the secondary school grounds contain a mass grave for 97 victims.

A large number of survivors, estimated at about 400 were still alive in May 2019, living with physical and mental injuries as a result of the assault.

Challenges
One main challenge is that infrastructure built in the 1940s by the Italian priests is outdated and old. This includes classrooms, dormitories and staff houses.

Ombaci has only 50 teachers out of the required 65. Of the 50 teachers, government pays salaries for only 34. Sixteen teachers are paid from by the school, from the school fees collected. It would be ideal if all 50 teachers were paid by government. More ideal would be if government provided for salaries of all 65 required teachers at the college. Efforts have been put to renovate the existing structures since 2012 to date with support from the founding fathers the Comboni Missionaries, Parents and Old Boys Association.

See also
 Ombaci
 Mvara Secondary School
 Education in Uganda

References

External links
Ombaci: West Nile’s Lion Gets Out of Slumber As of 21 March 2016.

Boarding schools in Uganda
Boys' schools in Uganda
Secondary schools in Uganda
Education in Uganda
Arua
West Nile sub-region
Northern Region, Uganda
1943 establishments in the British Empire
Educational institutions established in 1943